The Battle of Ridgefield was in fact a raid near modern-date Danbury, Connecticut carried out by Benedict Arnold, along with two other Patriot generals, James Wooster and Arthur Silliman who carried out a raid on a British camp near the village of Ridgefield then located about 90 miles west of modern-day New Haven.  Around 700 American militia raided the camp shortly after sunset on April 27, 1777. Despite taking 100 casualties, the raid was more or less a success with the Americans inflicting about 154 casualties on the British and seizing some arms and ammunition, food, supplies, as well as 40 British prisoners. 

After the raid, Arnold withdrew his men back across the border into New York near the American Fort Independence on the lower Hudson River.

Background

The state of Connecticut was not a scene of conflict during the first two years of the American Revolutionary War, even though the war had begun in neighboring Massachusetts in April 1775, and New York City had been taken by the British in the New York and New Jersey campaign in the fall of 1776. Major General William Howe commanded the British forces in New York, and he drafted a plan for 1777 in which the primary goal was to take the American capital at Philadelphia.  Troops left to defend New York were to include a brigade of 3,000 provincial troops under the command of New York's former royal governor William Tryon, who was given a temporary promotion to "major general of the provincials" in spring 1777.  Howe's plan included authorizing Tryon to operate on the Hudson River or to "enter Connecticut as circumstances may point out."  Tryon was given one of the early operations of the season, a raid against a Continental Army depot at Danbury, Connecticut.  Howe had learned of the depot's existence through a spy working for British Indian agent Guy Johnson, and he had also met with some success in an earlier raid against the Continental Army outpost at Peekskill, New York.

A fleet was assembled consisting of 12 transports, a hospital ship, and some small craft, all under the command of Captain Henry Duncan. The landing force consisted of 1,500 regulars drawn from the 4th, 15th, 23rd, 27th, 44th, and 64th regiments, 300 Loyalists from the Prince of Wales American Regiment led by Montfort Browne, and a small contingent of the 17th Light Dragoons, all led by Generals Sir William Erskine and James Agnew.  Command of the entire operation was given to General Tryon, and the fleet sailed from New York on April 22, 1777.

The Danbury depot had been established in 1776 by order of the Second Continental Congress, and it primarily served forces located in the Hudson River valley.  In April 1777, the army began mustering regiments for that year's campaigns, and there were about 50 Continental Army soldiers and 100 local militia at Danbury under the command of Joseph Platt Cooke, a local resident and a colonel in the state militia.

Danbury

The British fleet was first spotted when it passed Norwalk.  When the troops landed messengers were dispatched to warn Danbury and local militia leaders of the movements.  Generals Wooster and Arnold were in New Haven when messengers reached them on April 26.  Wooster immediately sent the local militia to Fairfield.  When he and Arnold reached Fairfield, they learned that General Silliman had already departed for Redding, with orders that any militia raised should follow as rapidly as possible; they immediately moved in that direction.  The forces assembled at Redding moved toward Danbury in a pouring rain, but had only reached Bethel, about  short of Danbury by 11 pm, where they decided to spend the night rather than press on to Danbury with wet gunpowder.  The forces consisted of about 500 regular militia members and about 200 volunteers.

See also
List of American Revolutionary War battles

References

Bibliography

Further reading

 
 

1777 in the United States
Ridgefield
Ridgefield
Conflicts in 1777
Events in Fairfield County, Connecticut
Ridgefield, Connecticut
1777 in Connecticut
Ridgefield
Ridgefield